Noise Fest was an influential festival of no wave noise music performances curated by Thurston Moore of Sonic Youth at the New York City art space White Columns in June 1981. Sonic Youth made their first live appearances at this show. 

In mid 1981 Kim Gordon and Josh Baer convinced Thurston Moore to organize this nine-day noise festival to accommodate underemployed experimental performers in the downtown scene. The festival was held in the White Columns gallery, which had a capacity of 60 people. Each night three to five acts performed, including Glenn Branca, Rhys Chatham, Jeffrey Lohn, Built on Guilt, Rudolph Grey, the Avant Squares, Off Beach, Mofungo, Red Decade, NNB, Robin Crutchfield's Dark Day, Ad Hoc Rock, Smoking Section, Chinese Puzzle, Avoidance Behaviour, and Sonic Youth.

Recording history
In 1978 a similar series of punk rock influenced loud noise music mixed with performance art was held at New York’s Artists’ Space that led to the Brian Eno-produced recording No New York. This recording was seen by many as the first attempt to define the no wave sound, as it documented The Contortions, Teenage Jesus and the Jerks, Mars and DNA.

Music from the Noise Festival (aka Noise Fest) was first released as a cassette titled Noise Fest on ZG Music in 1981; the music label of the legendary ZG magazine organized by Rosetta Brookes. All material was recorded live at White Columns. This included the music of Ut, Lee Ranaldo, Mofungo,  Khmer Rouge, The Problem, Smoking Section, Sonic Youth, Jeff Lohn (of the Theoretical Girls), Ima, Jules Baptiste Red Decade, EQ'D, Avant Squares, Don King, Primivites, Ad Hoc Rock, Y Pants, John Rehnberger, Off Beach, Barbotemagus (as it is misspelled on the cover), Economical Animal, Chinese Puzzle, Glorious Strangers, Built On Guilt (Robert Longo, Brian Hudson, Jeffrey Glenn, and Karol Hogloff), Oma Fakir, Lampshades. In 1982 the Noise Festival Tape was released by White Columns.

Influence

Noise Fest inspired the Speed Trials noise rock series organized by Live Skull members in May 1983 at White Columns. Among an art installation created by David Wojnarowicz and Joseph Nechvatal, various performance artists such as Ilona Granet and Emily XYZ did their acts intermixing with the music of The Fall, Beastie Boys, Live Skull, Sonic Youth, Lydia Lunch, Elliott Sharp, Swans and Arto Lindsay.

Speed Trials was eventually released as a live album recorded by Mark Roule and became one of the best-selling independent records of its time.

Discography
Noise Festival Tape (1982) TSoWC  White Columns
Noise Fest (1981) cassette tape, ZG Music
Speed Trials (1984) Homestead Records HMS-011

See also
Cassette culture
List of experimental music festivals
List of noise musicians
Post-punk
Noise music

References
Marc Masters, (2007) "No Wave", Black Dog Publishing, London
Paul Hegarty, Noise/Music: A History (2007) Continuum International Publishing Group
RoseLee Goldberg, Performance: Live Art Since 1960 (1998) Harry N. Abrams, NY NY
Thurston Moore, Mix Tape: The Art of Cassette Culture (2004) Universe

Footnotes

Noise music
No wave
Experimental music festivals